Rachedbine, Rechdibbine,    is a Maronite village in Koura District of Lebanon.

References

External links
Rechdibbine, Localiban

Maronite Christian communities in Lebanon
Populated places in the North Governorate
Koura District